Monty Lewis (1907–1997) was an American painter, muralist, and educator.
He was a 1930 Guggenheim Fellow.

Life
Lewis was born in Cardiff, Wales.
He studied at the Art Students League of New York.
He was a member of the Federal Art Project, and painted murals at the Museum of Man building at the 1939 New York World's Fair as well as public schools in New Jersey.

He was founder and director of the Coronado School of Fine Arts.
His papers are held at the Archives of American Art.

References

External links
Oral history interview with Monty Lewis, 1964 June 25
http://schools.nyc.gov/community/facilities/PublicArt/Art/default.htm?ac=283
http://coronadolibrarylookout.blogspot.com/2011/11/art-in-coronado-library.html

1907 births
1997 deaths
Artists from Cardiff
Welsh expatriates in the United States
Federal Art Project artists